Platycrinitidae are an extinct family of Paleozoic stalked crinoids.

These stationary upper-level epifaunal suspension feeders lived during the Devonian, Permian and the Carboniferous periods, from 416.0 to 259.0 Ma.

Genera
Camptocrinus
Neoplatycrinus
Platycrinites
Pleurocrinus

References

Camerata (Crinoidea)
Prehistoric echinoderm families
Devonian first appearances
Permian extinctions